Kafarat (also Romanized as Kafarāt and Kafrāt) is a village in Estakhr-e Posht Rural District, Hezarjarib District, Neka County, Mazandaran Province, Iran. At the 2006 census, its population was 318, in 72 families.

References 

Populated places in Neka County